SangSom (แสงโสม) is a rum from Thailand, distilled from sugarcane. It was introduced in November 1977 and has since become a dominant brand in the Thai spirits market. Over 70 million litres are sold in Thailand each year, achieving a market share of more than 70 percent in its category.

"SangSom Special Rum", as it is called on its website, is distilled from molasses. Its alcohol content is 40 percent by volume. It is aged in charred oak barrels for five years before bottling. 

The drink won gold medals in liquor competitions in Madrid, Spain in 1982 and 1983, and again in Barcelona in 2006. The medals are featured prominently on the product's packaging and have led to it being referred to locally as "SangSom Rianthong" (SangSom Gold Medallion).

The beverage is virtually unheard of outside Thailand. The manufacturers, SangSom Company, export to around 20 countries, but export sales account for barely one percent of total sales. SangSom Company is a member of Thai Beverage Public Company, which itself is a group company of International Beverage Holdings Limited.

See also 
 Mekhong

References

Rums
Thai distilled drinks
Thai drink brands
Products introduced in 1977